The Latin Grammy Award for Best Sertaneja Music Album is an honor presented annually at the Latin Grammy Awards, a ceremony that recognizes excellence and creates a wider awareness of cultural diversity and contributions of Latin recording artists in the United States and internationally. According to the category description guide for the 13th Latin Grammy Awards, the award is for vocal or instrumental Sertaneja music albums containing at least 51% playing time of newly recorded material.  For Solo artists, duos or groups. 

It was first presented at the 1st Annual Latin Grammy Awards in 2000. From 2004 to 2008 the category was not presented.

Brazilian sertanejo duo Chitãozinho & Xororó hold the record of most wins in the category with four, followed by Sérgio Reis with three wins. Reis was also the first recipient of the award for his album Sérgio Reis e Convidados. Other multiple winners are duo Zezé Di Camargo & Luciano and singer Paula Fernandes with two wins each.

Winners and nominees

2000s

2010s

2020s

References

External links
Official site of the Latin Grammy Awards

Latin Grammy Awards for Portuguese language music
Sertaneja Album